Tarlach Mac Suibhne (known as An Píobaire Mór, meaning The Great Piper), c. 1831–1916,  was a notable Irish piper.

He was born in Baile an Droichid, Gaoth Dobhair, County Donegal, and he is buried in the Maghergallen cemetery.

In 1893 he attracted international popularity when he went to play at the World Exhibition in Chicago where he won the world championship. His bagpipes can be viewed at the Rossnowlagh Museum.

Variations of his name in English include, Tarlach Mac Sweeney, Turlough Mac Sweeney and Tarlagh Mac Sweeney. He was a namesake and kinsman of Toirdhealbhach Mac Suibhne.

References

 Bill Haneman

1831 births
1916 deaths
Irish uilleann pipers
19th-century Irish people
Musicians from County Donegal
People from Gweedore